Maratino is a poorly attested extinct language that was spoken in north-east Mexico, near Martín, Tamaulipas. Swanton, who called it 'Tamaulipeco', classified it as Uto-Aztecan based on a few obvious cognates, such as Maratino chiguat 'woman' ~ Nahuatl cihuātl 'woman' and peyot 'peyote' ~ Nahuatl peyotl, but other scholars have not considered this to be enough to classify the language.

Vocabulary
The following vocabulary list of Maratino is from John Swanton (1940: 122–124).

{| class="wikitable sortable"
! gloss !! Maratino
|-
| able || kugtima
|-
| after the manner of || niwa
|-
| although || kuaahne
|-
| and || he
|-
| arrow || ciri
|-
| bird || magtc
|-
| bow || mahkā
|-
| but yet || kuaahne
|-
| children || tzikuini
|-
| come home, to || utepa
|-
| cord || pong
|-
| cry, to || mimigihi
|-
| deer || kons(gio)
|-
| (diminutive suffix) || -i
|-
| drink, to || baah(ka)
|-
| eat, to || migtikui
|-
| enemy || koapagtzi
|-
| escape, to || kugtima
|-
| far || kuiüsikuima
|-
| flee, to || pamini
|-
| forces || koh
|-
| forest (?) || tamu
|-
| go, to || nohgima
|-
| joy || maamehe
|-
| kill, to || paahtcu
|-
| leap, to || maatzimetzu
|-
| like || niwa
|-
| lion || xuri
|-
| little || -i
|-
| many || a-a
|-
| meat || migtikui
|-
| mountain || tamu
|-
| not || -he
|-
| now || mohka
|-
| our || ming
|-
| peyote || peyot
|-
| (plural suffix) || -a
|-
| run, to || kuino, kugtima
|-
| see, to || tepeh
|-
| shots || katama
|-
| shout, to || nohgima
|-
| shout for joy, to || maamehe
|-
| sleep, to || tutcē
|-
| strength || koh
|-
| the || tze
|-
| them || me
|-
| these || tze
|-
| to || tamu
|-
| unable || kugtimā
|-
| us || ko, ming
|-
| very || kuiüsikuima
|-
| war, to || tamu
|-
| we || ming
|-
| weep, to || mimigihi
|-
| without || -he
|-
| wolf || bum
|-
| woman || tciwat
|-
| woods || tamu
|-
| yet || kuaahne
|}

References

Further reading
Swanton, John. 1940. Linguistic material from the tribes of southern Texas and northern Mexico. (122–124)

Language isolates of North America
Indigenous languages of Mexico
Extinct languages of North America